Aeronauticum is the official German maritime aircraft museum – located in Nordholz (close to Cuxhaven, Lower Saxony). The museum has a large collection of aircraft that has been used by the German Marine/Navy, among other places also in the adjacent Nordholz Naval Airbase. The name of the museum derives from Greek ὰήρ āēr which means "air" and ναυτική nautikē which means "navigation, Airmanship", i.e. "navigation of the air".

Gallery

See also

List of aerospace museums

German Military Museums
German Tank Museum
Luftwaffenmuseum der Bundeswehr, German airforce museum in Berlin
Militärhistorisches Museum der Bundeswehr, major German military museum in Dresden

Naval Aviation museums
Fleet Air Arm Museum, United Kingdom
Fleet Air Arm Museum (Australia), Australian museum of naval aviation, Nowra, New South Wales
National Naval Aviation Museum, United States museum of naval aviation, Naval Air Station Pensacola, Florida
Naval Aviation Museum (India), Indian naval aviation museum, Goa, India
Shearwater Aviation Museum, Canadian naval aviation museum, Sheerwater, Nova Scotia.

External links

Official website

Nordholz
Buildings and structures in Cuxhaven (district)
Aerospace museums in Germany
Museums in Lower Saxony